Tim Howard (born 1979) is an American professional soccer player.

Tim Howard may also refer to:

 Tim Howard (attorney) (born 1961), American lawyer
 Tim Howard (field hockey) (born 1996), Australian field hockey player
 Tim Howard (sheriff), sheriff of Erie County, New York (state)
 Soltero (musician), American singer/songwriter